WNEO (channel 45) is a non-commercial educational television station licensed to Alliance, Ohio, United States. It is simulcast full-time over satellite station WEAO (channel 49) in Akron, Ohio. Both are member stations of PBS and jointly brand as PBS Western Reserve. WNEO is the Youngstown market's PBS station of record, while WEAO provides the Cleveland market with a second choice for PBS programming alongside the market's primary PBS station, WVIZ (channel 25).

WNEO and WEAO are owned by Northeastern Educational Television of Ohio, which is a consortium of the University of Akron, Kent State University and Youngstown State University. The two stations operate from studios on Kent State's campus in Kent, northeast of Akron and roughly west of Youngstown. WNEO's transmitter is located in Salem, while WEAO's transmitter is based in Copley Township.

WNEO also operates W13DP-D, a low-power digital translator in Youngstown, which serves low-lying areas in the Mahoning Valley that are not covered from the main WNEO signal. The translator signed on as analog W58AM in May 1980, converted to digital as W44CR-D in November 2009, and moved to its current channel in November 2019.

Overview

WNEO first signed on the air on May 30, 1973. It was originally intended to serve all of northeast Ohio from Youngstown to Cleveland. Its city of license, Alliance, is split between both major markets in the region. Most of the city is in Stark County, which is in the Cleveland market; a small portion is in Mahoning County, home to Youngstown. However, it was later decided to reorient WNEO to serve Youngstown and sign on a satellite station to serve Akron and Cleveland. That station, WEAO, signed on the air more than two years later on September 21, 1975. Prior to WEAO's sign-on, the channel 49 allocation in the Cleveland/Akron market was occupied by Akron-based WAKR-TV from 1953 to 1967, when that station moved to UHF channel 23 (WAKR now operates as Ion Television owned-and-operated station WVPX-TV).

Until October 1, 2008, WEAO and WNEO were jointly branded as "PBS 45 & 49". On October 1, 2008, at 5:30 a.m., WNEO and WEAO changed their on-air branding to "Western Reserve PBS", as part of the parent organization's overall branding change to Western Reserve Public Media. The rebranding was done to make the station's identity better reflect the viewing area, and due to the fact that the combined WNEO/WEAO operations are broadcast on different cable, satellite and UHF antenna channels in their respective service areas.

Technical information

Subchannels 
The stations' digital signals are multiplexed:

WNEO and WEAO carried Create on digital channels 45.3 and 49.3 and the Ohio Channel on digital channels 45.4 and 49.4 until August 2007, when the two subchannels were removed to make room for their high definition feeds. The analog simulcast of WNEO/WEAO remained on digital channels 45.2 and 49.2 until the June 12, 2009, digital transition, when they were replaced with Western Reserve PBS Fusion, a local service which aired concerts and music-related programs until August 1, 2009, at which point it switched to a mix of local programming; WNEO/WEAO then added MHz Worldview to digital channels 45.3 and 49.3 on June 13. WNEO and WEAO carried V-Me on digital channels 45.4 and 49.4 on September 19, 2009. The channel was discontinued in April 2017.

Translator

Analog-to-digital conversion
WNEO discontinued regular programming on its analog signal, over UHF channel 45, on November 19, 2008. Two days later on November 21, the station's digital signal relocated from its pre-transition UHF channel 46 to channel 45 for post-transition operations.

WEAO discontinued regular programming on its analog signal, over UHF channel 49, on June 12, 2009, the official date in which full-power television stations in the United States transitioned from analog to digital broadcasts under federal mandate. The station's digital signal remained on its pre-transition UHF channel 50, using PSIP to display the station's virtual channel as its former UHF analog channel 49.

References

External links
WNEO/WEAO official website
Station history

Alliance, Ohio
Kent, Ohio
PBS member stations
Television channels and stations established in 1973
1973 establishments in Ohio
NEO
Kent State University
University of Akron
Youngstown State University
First Nations Experience affiliates
Classic Arts Showcase affiliates